

Thomas Bitton (sometimes Thomas de Bytton; died 1307) was a medieval Bishop of Exeter.

Life
Bitton was the nephew of William of Bitton I, who was Bishop of Bath from 1248 to 1264. His brother was William of Bitton II, Bishop of Bath from 1267 to 1274.

Bitton was elected between 8 October and 30 November 1291 and consecrated on 16 March 1292. He died on 21 September 1307. In his will, he left funds to give one penny each to 10,212 poor people. He was also a benefactor of Dorchester Friary, Dorset.

Citations

References

External links
 "Entry for Thomas" in George Oliver's Lives of the Bishops of Exeter

Bishops of Exeter
13th-century English Roman Catholic bishops
14th-century English Roman Catholic bishops
13th-century births
1307 deaths
Year of birth unknown